This article details the Salford Red Devils rugby league football club's 2014 season. This is the 19th season of the Super League era. This will also be the 1st season that they have played under the Red Devils name.

Pre season friendlies

Red Devils score is first.

Player appearances

 = Injured

 = Suspended

Super League

Matches

Table

Player appearances

 = Injured

 = Suspended

Challenge Cup

Player appearances

Squad statistics

 Appearances and points include (Super League, Challenge Cup and Play Offs) as of 28 June 2014.

 = Injured
 = Suspended

Transfers

Ins

Outs

References

External links
 www.reds.co.uk

Salford Red Devils seasons
Salford Red Devils season